Tegula hotessieriana is a species of sea snail, a marine gastropod mollusk in the family Tegulidae.

Description
The size of the shell varies between 5 mm and 13 mm. The solid, umbilicate shell has a conical shape. It is deep green, brown, pinkish or olivaceous, more or less dotted with white and a self-color, sometimes radiately flammulated with white. A tract around the umbilicus is white, tessellated with brown. The spire is elevated, sometimes scalariform. The apex acute. The upper whorls are slightly convex.  The body whorl is convex, depressed below the suture and, rounded at the periphery. The whole surface bears numerous low, smooth spiral striae, which are often subobsolete on the body whorl, and it is then nearly smooth. The base of the shell is concave in the middle. The aperture is rounded-quadrate, smooth within or finely lirate. The columella is slightly sinuous, bidentate at base, expanding in a callus above, which slightly impinges upon the umbilicus.

Distribution
This species occurs in the Caribbean Sea, the Gulf of Mexico, off the Lesser Antilles; in the Atlantic Ocean along the Mid-Atlantic Ridge and off Brazil.

References

 Adams, C. B. 1845. Specierum novarum conchyliorum, in Jamaica repertorum, synopsis. Proceedings of the Boston Society of Natural History 2: 1–17
 Rosenberg, G., F. Moretzsohn, and E. F. García. 2009. Gastropoda (Mollusca) of the Gulf of Mexico, Pp. 579–699 in Felder, D.L. and D.K. Camp (eds.), Gulf of Mexico–Origins, Waters, and Biota. Biodiversity. Texas A&M Press, College Station, Texas

External links
 

hotessieriana
Gastropods described in 1842